Son of man is  the translation of various Hebrew and Greek phrases used in the Hebrew Bible, various apocalyptic works of the intertestamental period, and in the Greek New Testament.

Son of man may also refer to:

Religion
 Son of man (Christianity), one of the names and titles of Jesus in the New Testament
 Son of man (Judaism), denoting mankind generally in contrast to deity or godhead, with special reference to the human weakness and frailty

Film and television
 Son of Man (1980 film), a 1980 South Korean film directed by Yu Hyun-mok, based upon the 1979 novel
 Son of Man (2006 film), a 2006 South African film that debuted at the Sundance Film Festival
 Son of Man (play), a 1969 television play by Dennis Potter
 A Son of Man, a 2018 film

Literature
 Son of Man (novel), a 1971 science fiction novel by Robert Silverberg that explores humanity by musing about its manifestations millions of years into the future.
 Son of Man, a 1979 novel by Yi Munyol
 Son of Man, a 2004 collection of Hellblazer 129-133
 Hijo de hombre, a 1960 book by the Paraguayan author Augusto Roa Bastos
 Jesus, the Son of Man, a 1928 book by Kahlil Gibran about the life of Jesus
 The Son of Man (book), a 1998 nonfiction book by Andrew Harvey about the life of Jesus

Music
 Son of Man (album), by Hazakim, 2014

Groups and labels
 Son of Man, an offshoot of the Welsh progressive rock band Man
 Sunz of Man, a Wu-Tang Clan affiliated rap group

Choral and orchestral works
 "Mab y Dyn" ("Son of Man"), a 1967 choral by Arwel Hughes
 "Son of Man", a 1975 large-scale Orchestral/Choral work by Philip Cannon, commissioned to mark Britain's entry into Europe

Songs
 "Son of Man" (song), written in 1999 by Phil Collins written for Disney's film Tarzan
 "Son of Man", a 2006 track on the 10cc album Greatest Hits ... And More

Other uses
 The Son of Man, a 1964 painting by René Magritte

See also

 Human
 Månsson (disambiguation)
 Manson (disambiguation)
 Mans (disambiguation)
 
 Son (disambiguation)
 Man (disambiguation)
 Men (disambiguation)
 Sons of Adam (disambiguation)
 Bani Adam (disambiguation) (lit. sons of man)